The 332nd Air Expeditionary Wing (332 AEW) is a Provisional Wing of Air Combat Command, currently active. It was last inactivated on 8 May 2012, and most recently reactivated on 19 May 2015.

The Wing's 332nd Expeditionary Operations Group (332 EOG), is the direct descendant organization of the World War II 332nd Fighter Group, the Tuskegee Airmen.  The title Tuskegee Airmen refers to all who trained in the groundbreaking Army Air Forces African-American pilot training program at Moton Field and Tuskegee Army Airfield, Alabama between 1941 and 1945. It includes pilots, navigators, bombardiers, maintenance and support staff, instructors and all the personnel who kept the planes in the air.

Overview
The 332 AEW conducted a number of missions.  The F-16 aircraft were responsible for maintaining air supremacy in the skies over Iraq.  Additionally, the A-10 and F-16 aircraft performed close air support missions as required.  The C-130 unit provided required airlift within Iraq and to other US Central Command bases as necessary.  The HH-60 Pave Hawks performed combat search and rescue missions.  Finally, the MQ-1 Predators and MC-12W Liberty aircraft provided tactical surveillance and reconnaissance within Iraq.  Additionally, the unit operated the Air Force Theater Hospital and served as the Contingency Aeromedical Staging Facility.

The 332nd Air Expeditionary Wing's heritage is tied to the famous 332nd Fighter Group led by the Tuskegee Airmen in World War II.
Its mission and traditions were carried out by the airmen at Joint Base Balad, Iraq.  With the motto "Tuskegee Airmen...The Legend Continues," the wing pioneered modern warfare tactics using advanced weapons systems such as the F-16 Fighting Falcon, A-10 Thunderbolt II, and the MQ-1 Predator unmanned aerial vehicle (UAV) for close air support and traditional and non-traditional intelligence, surveillance, and reconnaissance missions.

In a departure from traditional Air Force missions, the 732nd Air Expeditionary Group (732 AEG), provided command oversight and advocacy for up to 1,800 Air Force personnel who were tactically assigned to U.S. Army and Marine units throughout Iraq.  Operating from Balad Air Base at its inception, six squadrons of the 732 AEG provided direct Joint and Coalition combat and combat support to and/or in lieu of US Army, Marine Corps and Iraqi Army and Police Forces at over 60 locations, including downtown Baghdad; Camp Speicher; Al Asad Air Base; Camp Anaconda (Balad Air Base); Camp Bucca; Camp Caldwell (Kirkush); Tallil Air Base; Mosul Air Base; Camp Rustamiyah; Baghdad International Airport; Green Zone; Kirkuk Air Base; Camp Hadithah; and Taji Air Base.

Units
Current units
 1st Expeditionary Rescue Group at Al Asad Airbase, Iraq. The unit was formerly at Diyarbakır Air Base, Turkey.
 447th Air Expeditionary Group at Incirlik Air Base, Turkey.
 332nd Expeditionary Operations Group
 332nd Expeditionary Maintenance Group
 332nd Expeditionary Mission Support Group
 332nd Expeditionary Medical Group
 22nd Expeditionary Air Refueling Squadron

Former units

At Joint Base Balad (JBB), the 332nd Air Expeditionary Wing consisted of the following major groups:
 332nd Expeditionary Maintenance Group
 Provided combat-ready aircraft and munitions to the Air Component Commander in support of Coalition forces throughout Iraq.  Was responsible for on- and off-aircraft maintenance and sortie generation in support of F-16 Fighting Falcons, C-130 Hercules, HH-60 Pave Hawks, MQ-1 Predators, and the MC-12 Liberty, as well as launch, recovery and servicing support for military and commercial transient aircraft

 332nd Expeditionary Medical Group
 Consisted of approximately 357 professional and support staff from all four armed services working alongside civilians and contractors that provided state-of-the-art medical care. The medical group was the only air-evacuation hospital in Iraq and provided a full-spectrum of medical services for Coalition and U.S. forces throughout the Iraqi theater of operations.

 332nd Expeditionary Mission Support Group
 Enabled sustained and protected combat capability for US Air Forces Central, 332nd Air Expeditionary Wing, Joint Base Balad, and detachments. The 332 EMSG provided expeditionary communications, services, civil engineering, force protection, personnel accountability, and logistics-readiness operations in support of DoD's busiest single-runway operation. In addition, the 332 EMSG provided base-life support to the approximately 26,000 servicemembers and civilians on JBB.

 332nd Expeditionary Operations Group
 See 332nd Expeditionary Operations Group article.

332nd Expeditionary Security Forces Group
The Security Forces Group was activated on 24 July 2008, at JBB, Iraq. Its activation marked the first time the Air Force deployed more than 900 people within a single unit to defend an air base in combat since the Vietnam War. The members of the 332nd ESFG work side-by-side with soldiers of the U.S. and Iraqi armies to provide physical security in the area around JBB. The Group was made up of two squadrons; the 332nd Expeditionary Security Forces Squadron provided base law enforcement and flight line security and the 532nd Expeditionary Security Forces Squadron provided security at the three entry control points to the base as well as a quick reaction force for "outside-the-wire" missions. The group was initially led by Colonel Decknick who was the prior Group commander for the 820th Security Forces Group.

732 Air Expeditionary Group
The 732 AEG, originally the 732 Expeditionary Mission Support Group, was re-designated an air expeditionary group in December 2006 to reflect its theater-wide responsibilities.  Operating from Balad Air Base, the six squadrons of the 732 AEG provided direct Joint and Coalition combat and combat support to and/or in lieu of US Army, Marine Corps and Iraqi Army and Police Forces at over 44 locations, including downtown Baghdad; Camp Speicher; Al Asad Air Base; Camp Anaconda; Camp Bucca; Camp Habbaniyah; Camp Caldwell (Kirkush); Tallil Air Base; Mosul Air Base; Camp Rustamiyah; Baghdad International Airport; Green Zone; Kirkuk Air Base; Camp Hadithah; and Taji Air Base.  732 AEG had over 1800 Airmen assigned, including security forces, RED HORSE and civil engineers, lawyers, truck drivers, interrogators, military working dog teams, intelligence specialists, explosive ordnance disposal specialist, logisticians, and airfield managers.

History
 See: 332nd Air Expeditionary Group for the World War II fighter unit.
Established in July 1947 under the United States Air Force's Wing /Base reorganization (Hobson Plan), with the 332nd Fighter Group becoming the operational component of the wing, controlling its flying resources.  the 332nd Fighter Wing replaced the 447th Composite Group and 580th Air Service Group. The new wing participated in firepower demonstrations, gunnery training, and operational missions to maintain combat proficiency.   The African-American segregated unit was inactivated in July 1949 as a result of Executive Order 9981. EO 9981 abolished racial discrimination in the United States Armed Forces.  The 332nd's personnel and equipment were reassigned to other units.

Air Expeditionary Wing

In August 2002, the Air Combat Command (ACC) 332nd Air Expeditionary Group at Ahmad al-Jaber Air Base, Kuwait, was authorized to expand to a Wing.  The 332nd Air Expeditionary Wing was activated as a provisional organization on 12 August 2002 by ACC, with the 332nd AEG becoming the Wing's flying organization.  A support organization was also activated as part of the 332 AEW, consisting of the 332nd Expeditionary Maintenance Group; 332nd Expeditionary Mission Support Group; 332nd Expeditionary Medical Group, and the 332nd Expeditionary Security Forces Group.

At its peak strength, the 332nd AEW consisted of over 8,000 personnel, including 1,800 Airmen of the 732 AEG, provided operational oversight for Airmen tactically assigned to U.S. Army and Marine units at over 60 forward operating locations throughout Iraq.

Employing A-10 Thunderbolt IIs, F-16 Fighting Falcons, HH-60 Pave Hawk rescue helicopters and HC-130 Hercules aircraft the 332nd AEW initially participated in Operation Enduring Freedom (OEF), playing a critical role in the defeat of the Taliban regime and later providing key air support for Afghanistan's provisional government.

After the initiation of Operation Iraqi Freedom (OIF) the 332nd was moved to Tallil Air Base, Iraq.  To better position airpower within the theater of operations, the 332nd AEW was moved to Balad AB, Iraq, in February 2004.  In June 2008, the base was officially renamed Joint Base Balad.  The new name was indicative of the joint nature of operations by all branches of service at the base.

During the height of operations, the 332nd AEW contained nine groups—including four geographically separated groups at Ali AB, Sather AB, Al Asad AB, and Kirkuk AB—as well as numerous detachments and operating locations scattered throughout Iraq. The wing had as many as two F-16 fighter squadrons, a Predator UAV squadron, a C-130 squadron, a combat search and rescue squadron (HH-60s), a MC-12 Liberty squadron, and a Control and Reporting Center.

During the drawdown of forces from Iraq, the 332nd AEW provided intelligence, surveillance and reconnaissance, combat search and rescue, armed overwatch and close air support to one of the largest logistics movements since World War II.

In support of the re-posture of U.S. forces, the wing continued to support U.S. Forces-Iraq after forward deploying to an undisclosed air base in Southwest Asia in November 2011 so Joint Base Balad could be returned to the government of Iraq.  And as the last U.S. convoy left Iraq on 18 December 2011 with the 332nd AEW's F-16s and MQ-1B Predators in the skies providing overhead watch.

Lineage
 Established as 332nd Fighter Wing on 28 July 1947
 Organized on 15 August 1947
 Discontinued on 28 August 1948
 Activated on 28 August 1948
 Inactivated on 1 July 1949
 Redesignated as 332nd Air Expeditionary Wing, 1 August 2002
 Converted to provisional status and allocated to Air Combat Command to activate or inactivate any time after 1 August 2002
 Activated on 12 August 2002
 Inactivated on 8 May 2012
 Activated on 19 May 2015

Assignments
 Ninth Air Force, 15 August 1947 – 28 August 1948; 26 August 1948 – 1 July 1949
 Attached to: First Air Force, 15 Jan-l Feb 1949
 Air Combat Command
 Attached to: United States Central Command Air Forces, 12 August 2002 – 5 August 2009
 Attached to: United States Air Forces Central, 5 August 2009 – 8 May 2012; 19 May 2015–present.

Components
 332nd Fighter Group, (later Air Expeditionary Group), 15 August 1947 – 28 August 1948; 26 August 1948 – 1 July 1949. 12 August 2002 – 8 May 2012
 332nd Expeditionary Maintenance Group
 332nd Expeditionary Mission Support Group
 332nd Expeditionary Medical Group
 332nd Expeditionary Security Forces Group
 407th Air Expeditionary Group
 438th Air Expeditionary Group
 447th Air Expeditionary Group
 506th Air Expeditionary Group
 732nd Air Expeditionary Group
 332nd Expeditionary Communications Squadron

Stations
 Lockbourne AAB (later, AFB), Ohio, 15 August 1947 – 1 July 1949
 Ahmad al-Jaber Air Base, Kuwait, 12 August 2002
 Tallil Air Base, Iraq, March 2003
 Balad Air Base (later Joint Base Balad), Iraq, 2004
 Undisclosed Location, 18 December 2011 – 8 May 2012
 Undisclosed Location, 19 May 2015 – Present'''

Aircraft

 F-47N Thunderbolt, 1947–1949
 O/A-10 Thunderbolt II, 1995, 1999, 2001–2003
 F/A-18C/D Hornet, 2002
 MQ-1A Predator, 2003–2011
 HH-60 Pave Hawk, 2003–2011
 F-16C/D Fighting Falcon, 2003–2011

 F-15C/D Eagle, 2003–2011
 F-15E Strike Eagle, 2003–2011
 C-130 Hercules, 2003–2011
 A-10 Thunderbolt II, 2007–2011
 MC-12W Liberty, 2009–2011
 P-51C/D Mustang, 1944-1945

Decorations
 Air Force Outstanding Unit Award with Valor Iraq, 16 September 2002 – 15 September 2003
 Air Force Meritorious Unit Award Iraq, 1 May 2005 – 31 January 2007
 Air Force Meritorious Unit Award Iraq, 1 February 2007 – 31 January 2008
 Air Force Meritorious Unit Award Iraq, 1 February 2008 – 31 January 2009
 Air Force Meritorious Unit Award Iraq, 1 June 2009 – 31 May 2010
 Air Force Meritorious Unit Award Iraq, 1 June 2010 – 31 May 2011

See also
332nd Expeditionary Operations Group – the famed World War II fighter group also known as the "Tuskegee Airmen"

References

Ravenstein, Charles A.  Air Force Combat Wings: Lineage and Honors Histories, 1947–1977 (Washington: USGPO, 1984)

External links
 332 AEW Heritage Site

0332